Rangamati Cantonment is a cantonment located in Rangamati. 305th Infantry Brigade of Bangladesh Army inhabit here under 24th infantry division..

It is one of five cantonment in Chittagong Hill Tracts area.

See also 
 Alikadam Cantonment
 Bandarban Cantonment
 Kaptai Cantonment

References

Cantonments of Bangladesh